Bragdy Nant  is an ale brewery near the town of Llanrwst, North Wales. The brewery produces cask and bottle-conditioned ales, and is one of four North Wales breweries jointly operating the Albion Ale House in the town of Conwy.  The name Bragdy Nant is Welsh for River or Stream Brewery.

Bragdy Nant's dark ale Mwnci Nel was awarded silver in CAMRA's 2010 Champion Beer of Wales competition. The brewery has also produced an ale for the nearby Plas y Brenin mountaineering centre in Capel Curig.

References

Breweries in Wales